María Teresa Jiménez-Becerril Barrio (born 24 July 1961 at Seville) is a Spanish politician, journalist and businesswomen who served as a Member of the European Parliament from 2004 until 2014.

In 2002 Jiménez-Becerril became President of the Jiménez Becerril Foundation and, in 2009, she was elected as a Member of the European Parliament representing the Partido Popular and was returned to Brussels in 2014 European elections.

In early 2014, the Partido Popular chose Jiménez-Becerril to be the party list's number 3 for the 2014 European elections, following Miguel Arias Cañete and Esteban González Pons. Following the elections, she was elected chairwoman of the delegation to the EU-Mexico Joint Parliamentary Committee. In addition to her committee assignments, Jiménez-Becerril was a member of the European Parliament Intergroup on Disability.

In addition to her committee assignments, Jiménez-Becerril has been a substitute member of the Spanish delegation to the Parliamentary Assembly of the Council of Europe (PACE) since 2020, where she serves on the Committee on Legal Affairs and Human Rights and the Committee on Social Affairs, Health and Sustainable Development.

Other activities
 Fundación Alberto Jiménez-Becerril contra el Terrorismo, President

References

External links
 www.fundacionalbertojimenez-becerril.org

1961 births
Living people
Complutense University of Madrid alumni
Members of the 13th Congress of Deputies (Spain)
MEPs for Spain 2009–2014
MEPs for Spain 2014–2019
21st-century women MEPs for Spain
People from Seville
People's Party (Spain) MEPs
Spanish women journalists
Women members of the Congress of Deputies (Spain)
Members of the 14th Congress of Deputies (Spain)